Clarence Lee Swartz (1868–1936) was an American individualist anarchist, whose best-known work, What is Mutualism? (1927) is a book explaining the economic system of mutualism.

Swartz was a friend of Benjamin Tucker and frequent contributor of signed and unsigned editorials to Tucker's newspaper Liberty. In addition, he worked for a series of anarchist newspapers and journals. He worked in the mechanical department of Liberty beginning in 1891, edited an anarchist journal called Voice of the People and served as assistant editor for Moses Harman's journal Lucifer, the Light-Bearer in 1890. Swartz was arrested in Kansas City, Missouri for distributing a newspaper called Sunday Sun in 1891. The charges were dropped when the prosecutor failed to show in court. He published two individualist anarchist periodicals at the turn of the century, I (beginning in 1898) and The Free Comrade (beginning in 1900). In 1908, Tucker's publishing business, including most of his books and plates, were destroyed in a fire and after Tucker retired from publishing and moved to Europe, "practically all of the literature of individualist anarchism [went] out of print".

Swartz made efforts throughout the 1920s to revive the individualist literature. He prepared and edited Individual Liberty: Selections from the Writings of Benjamin R. Tucker (New York: Vanguard Press), a collection of excerpts from Tucker's writing in Liberty, which was the first collection of Tucker's writing since Tucker's own collection Instead of a Book. In 1923 he worked together with Charles T. Sprading and J. William Lloyd on The Libertarian, a magazine opposed to blue laws, Prohibition and the censorship of arts and entertainment. In 1927, Swartz published his own book What is Mutualism?, a new synthesis of individualist and mutualist thought on economics and strategy.

Swartz was a strong proponent of private property in the individualist anarchism sense of the word and critical of anarcho-communism. In his 1927 What is Mutualism, Swartz writes: "One of the tests of any reform movement with regard to personal liberty is this: Will the movement prohibit or abolish private property? If it does, it is an enemy of liberty. For one of the most important criteria of freedom is the right to private property in the products of ones labor. State Socialists, Communists, Syndicalists and Communist-Anarchists deny private property".

References

External links
 Clarence Lee Swartz (1898), I (Number One), July 1898.
 Clarence Lee Swartz (1898), I (Number Two), August 1898.
 Clarence Lee Swartz (1923), "Our Purpose and Reason for Being", in The Libertarian Vol. I, No. 1. 1.
 Clarence Lee Swartz (1927). What is Mutualism?.

1868 births
1936 deaths
19th-century American male writers
19th-century American non-fiction writers
20th-century American male writers
20th-century American non-fiction writers
American anarchists
American male journalists
American male non-fiction writers
Anarchist theorists
Anarchist writers
Individualist anarchists
Mutualists
Voluntaryists